Daphnée Lynn Duplaix Samuel (born August 18, 1976) is an American actress and model.

Career
After appearing in Playboy magazine as Playmate of the Month July 1997, she appeared in several Playboy videos. Her Playmate pictorial was photographed by Richard Fegley.

In early Playboy publications her first name is spelled Daphneé (with an acute accent on the second 'e'). Her Playboy centerfold is signed Daphnee, and she also used that form on her official web site.

Duplaix became a regular cast member on the American television soap opera Passions in 2004, playing Valerie Davis until 2008. In January 2009, Duplaix served as a host of the Playboy TV game show Show Us Your Wits. She next began appearing as Rachel Gannon on the ABC soap opera One Life to Live on April 7, 2009.

Personal life
Duplaix was previously married to Ron Samuel, with whom she has three sons. On June 28, 2014, she married Grady Heiberg. Their daughter was born in 2015.

Filmography

Film

Television

References

External links 

American people of French descent
American people of Haitian descent
American people of Italian descent
American soap opera actresses
Living people
People from Manhattan
1990s Playboy Playmates
American female models
21st-century American women
1976 births